Michele Vitali (born October 31, 1991) is an Italian professional basketball player for Reggio Emilia of the Italian Lega Basket Serie A (LBA) as a shooting guard.

Personal life

His brother is fellow pro basketball player Luca Vitali, Michele has played against him a few times in Serie A and together on a few occasions, including one season for Virtus Bologna and notably for the national team.

Their parents were also basketball players, their mother Anna Maria Mazzoli and their father Roberto both played in the Italian lower divisions, peculiarly they met in 1978 whilst they were attending an event with their respective youth national teams.

Professional career

Vitali progressed through the youth ranks of home town club Virtus Bologna, he was called up to the first squad on occasion and made his first division debut in February 2009 playing a single minute with one missed shot.
That was his only appearance for the senior team for the season, he wouldn't be able to break into the side either in 2009–10 with two solitary minutes but he played a decisive role as the Under-19 squad won their national championship.

To gain experience he was loaned to new Virtus satellite club Gira Ozzano  in the third division for 2010–11. It proved to be a fruitful loan as he played 27 games with 9,8 points on average for Gira.

Following this positive experience he returned to Virtus but didn't manage to break into the first squad, playing only three games the whole season. This prompted him to rescind his contract with Virtus and join cross town side Biancoblù Basket Bologna  of the Legadue in October 2012.   
His time with the white and blue proved successful, he established himself as a starter for the team, playing 27 games with 9.8 points on average and even participated in the Legadue All Star Game where he was voted best player under 24.

His performances garnered interest from Serie A clubs, after Biancoblù lost in the promotion playoffs, he joined Juvecaserta Basket in July 2014.

In his first full top division season Vitali was an important player as Caserta finished just outside the playoff places, playing in all but one game, he was also selected for the All Star Game after other players proved unavailable.

The 2014–15 season proved to be more complicated, Vitali missed the first part of the season with a knee injury and - as a starter - could not stop Caserta's relegation, confirmed after a loss in the last game of the season.

On July 2, 2015, Vitali signed a two-year contract with Virtus Bologna of the Italian LBA.

On August 4, 2016, Vitali signed a one-year deal with Basket Brescia Leonessa and joined his brother Luca Vitali. On June 29, 2017, he extended his contract with Brescia for one more season. On July 10, 2017, Michele officially left Brescia after two great seasons in LBA.

On July 10, 2018, Vitali signed a two-year contract with the Spanish club MoraBanc Andorra.

Vitali spent the 2019–20 season with Dinamo Sassari and averaged 10.3 points and three rebounds per game. On July 28, 2020, Vitali signed with Brose Bamberg of the German Basketball Bundesliga.

He returned in Italy on June 24, 2021, signing a multi-year contract with Reyer Venezia.

On August 6, 2022, he has signed with Reggio Emilia of the Italian Lega Basket Serie A (LBA).

Career statistics

Domestic league

Regular season

|-
| style="text-align:left;"| 2011-12
| style="text-align:left;"| Canadian Solar Bologna
| 3 || 0 || 3.3 || 1.7 || 0 || 100.0 || 66.7 || 0.7 || 0.3 || 0 || 0.3 || 0.7
|-
| style="text-align:left;"| 2013-14
| style="text-align:left;"| Pasta Reggia Caserta
| 29 || 8 || 23.7 || 8.3 || 46.5 || 30.9 || 70 || 3.4 || 1 || 0 || 0.7 || 0.9
|-
| style="text-align:left;"| 2014-15
| style="text-align:left;"| Pasta Reggia Caserta
| 22 || 21 || 25.4 || 7.5 || 42.9 || 25.4 || 78.4 || 2.5 || 1.3 || 0 || 0.8 || 1.9
|- class="sortbottom"
| style="text-align:left;"| Career
| style="text-align:left;"|
| 54 || 29 || 14.9 || 5.8 || 44.5 || 28.9 || 73.4 || 2.2 || 1.1 || 0 || 0.7 || 1.2

Italian national team
He played in the under age categories of the Italian national basketball team, first for the U18's in the 2009 European Championship then for the U20's in the 2010 European Championship and the 2011 European Championship, most notably winning the silver medal at the latter edition.

After falling off the radar for a period, he joined the senior team in 2014, playing a bit part in FIBA EuroBasket 2015 qualification in which Italy qualified for FIBA EuroBasket 2015.

References

External links
"Michele Vitali  at", Lega Basket. Retrieved on 11 May 2015.
"Michele Vitali at.", Eurobasket.com. Retrieved on 11 May 2015.
"Michele Vitali at.", RealGM. Retrieved on 11 May 2015.

1991 births
Living people
Basket Brescia Leonessa players
Basketball players at the 2020 Summer Olympics
BC Andorra players
Expatriate basketball people in Andorra
Brose Bamberg players
Dinamo Sassari players
Italian expatriate basketball people in Germany
Italian expatriate basketball people in Spain
Italian men's basketball players
Juvecaserta Basket players
Lega Basket Serie A players
Liga ACB players
Olympic basketball players of Italy
Pallacanestro Reggiana players
Reyer Venezia players
Shooting guards
Sportspeople from Bologna
Virtus Bologna players